Lebanon is a small middle-income country on the Eastern Mediterranean shore with a population of around 4 million Lebanese citizens, 1.2 million Syrian refugees, and half a million Palestinian refugees. It is at the third stage of its demographic transition characterized by a decline in both fertility and mortality rates. Moreover, Lebanon, like many countries in the Middle East is experiencing an epidemiological transition with an increasingly ageing population suffering from chronic and non-communicable diseases. Mortality related to non-communicable diseases is 404.4 deaths per 100,000 individuals, with an estimate of 45% due to cardiovascular diseases, making them the leading cause of death in Lebanon. Lebanon has health indices that are close to those of more developed countries, with a reported life expectancy at birth of 80.1 years (81.4 years for women and 78.8 years for men) and an under-five mortality rate of 9.5 per 1,000 live births in 2016. Since the end of the 15-year Lebanese Civil War in 1990, Lebanon’s health indicators have significantly improved.

Background

Cardiovascular Diseases
Cardiovascular diseases represent the leading cause of morbidity and mortality in Lebanon and are also the primary cause of hospital admission. In 2012, it was estimated that 31% of all deaths in Lebanon were due to ischemic heart disease. This high cardiovascular disease incidence can be attributed to several risk factors. For example, 42% of the Lebanese people are smokers, 29.4% are obese, 22.8% are diabetic, and 29.8% suffer from hypertension.

Cancers
Data from World Health Organization (WHO) Globocan 2012 have shown that in the Arab world, Lebanon has the highest lung cancer incidence in females and the third highest in males, with an age-standardized incidence rate among the world population (ASR(w)) per 100,000 person-years of 30.2% in men and 11% in women. Similarly, it has been reported that Lebanon has one of the highest ASR(w) of bladder cancer worldwide, with 29.1 as estimated ASR(w) of bladder cancer among males, thus falling second after Belgium (31.0). Trends in high lung and bladder cancer incidence are largely the product of changing smoking prevalence and patterns of tobacco consumption. Smoking is very prevalent and culturally ingrained into Lebanese society, with the most common forms of tobacco smoking in Lebanon being cigarettes or waterpipe smoking, which is gaining popularity, particularly among females. Relative to a single cigarette, a single waterpipe use episode is associated with similar peak plasma nicotine levels and three times greater peak levels of blood carboxyhemoglobin. The first five minutes of waterpipe smoking produce more than four times the increase in blood carboxyhemoglobin as smoking an entire cigarette. Adult smoking in Lebanon is estimated at 46% for males and 31% for females. Smoking prevalence among the youth is estimated to be among the highest worldwide (65.8% for boys and 54.1% for girls), with waterpipe smoking the major form of smoking (33.9%) followed by cigarette smoking (8.6%). In addition to smoking, urban air pollution measured by concentrations of particulate matter <10 mm in size exceeds the levels set by the WHO (20 mg/m3) in most urban Lebanese cities.

Refugees
In 2015, there were 452,669 registered Palestinian refugees in the country; more than half live in 12 Palestinian refugee camps. They are ineligible for state social services, including health care. Further adding to the issue is the amount of Syrian refugees, totalling almost one for every four Lebanese. These people are often forced to live in squalid conditions due to a lack of government resources. More often than not, these people are also subject to discrimination in certain aspects of life. This includes medical treatment, to which they have no legal right to according to Lebanese law.

Mental Health
Lebanon, a society of people generally wrought by war and loss, is currently plagued with mental health issues where a staggering 17% of citizens suffer from some form of non-war related mental illness. Having only three dedicated psychiatric facilities, but frequent access to psychiatrists and therapy, means that Lebanese has somewhat lacking access to psychiatric treatment by Western standards, but still better access than the rest of the Middle East and the Levant. Cultural stigma, however, often prevents sufferers from receiving the proper care they require and more often than not ends badly.

A horrendously troubling statistic by the WHO indicates that 49% of Lebanese are afflicted with some form of war-related trauma. This often includes former combatants, as well as many victims of the combat, suffering from PTSD. Furthermore, many victims of rape are subject to fear of stigma and do not report their victimization, thus preventing them proper medical and psychiatric treatment, and more importantly, justice.

In addition, it has also been estimated that on average, every 2.5 days, someone dies by suicide and every 6 hours, someone attempts suicide in Lebanon. Given the seriousness of the issue and the many lives it affects, “Embrace Lifeline”, Lebanon’s first suicide prevention hotline was established in 2016. This falls in line with the “Mental Health and Substance Use-Prevention, Promotion and Treatment-Strategy for Lebanon 2015–2020", launched by the Lebanese Ministry of Public Health with the aim of creating a more effective and comprehensive mental health treatment infrastructure in Lebanon.

Women's Health
Women have adequate access to gynecological and other female health facilities in Lebanon, excluding contraceptives. The Lebanese view on unborn children is that they are equivalent to an infant, thus making it difficult for legalization of abortion. However, abortion is rampant among women and frequently performed by the same doctors who call for its prohibition. Underage pregnancies as well as extramarital pregnancies are the most commonly terminated, often in decent conditions but occasionally not. The general consensus of the Lebanese indicates that most do not support abortion, however a significant urban population is currently vying for its legalization. Most Lebanese prefer the concept of birth then adoption by a sterile family, and this is a frequent occurrence. However, more often than not abortions are forced upon young mothers by family members attempting to preserve family honor.

References